Caribe pinche (literally "mediocre piranha") is a local term for either of 2 species of piranha:

 Serrasalmus elongatus (elongated piranha)
 Serrasalmus irritans (iridescent piranha)

Piranhas